Sextus Pompeius may refer to:

 Sextus Pompeius Magnus Pius, or Sextus Pompey, (67–35 BC), Roman general
 Sextus Pompeius Festus (fl. 2nd century AD), Roman grammarian
 Sextus Pompeius, paternal uncle of the  triumvir Gnaeus Pompeius Magnus ("Pompey"), and other relatives of the same name

See also
 Pompeius (disambiguation)
 Sextus